Retrospect is the third live album released by the Dutch symphonic metal band Epica in celebration of their tenth anniversary. The recorded live show took part in Eindhoven, Netherlands on March 23, 2013, at the Klokgebouw and was sold out. Because of the great demand by international fans, Epica announced a live stream, called the Retrostream, on March 4, 2013. Epica performed on stage with the same orchestra that accompanied Epica in the recording of the live album The Classical Conspiracy: the 70-piece Extended Hungarian Remenyi Ede Chamber Orchestra and the Choir of Miskolc National Theatre. The expanded ensemble mostly played Epica songs, including a whole new song called Retrospect, especially written for this live show with the same name. Like on The Classical Conspiracy, Epica played some classical music, excerpts from operas and movie soundtracks, however not as many as on the aforementioned show. The album was released on CD, DVD and Blu-ray on November 8, 2013, through Nuclear Blast Records. Before the release of the show on Blu-ray and DVD, the show premiered at two movie theaters: Mathäser Multiplex Kino in Munich, Germany (November 6) and Service Bioscoop Zien in Eindhoven, Netherlands (November 7). On the day of the release, the show was shown in a Belgian movie theater: Kinepolis in Kortrijk, Belgium. The day after, the show was shown a final time in a movie theater: Cineteca Nacional in Mexico City (November 9).

Track listing

Personnel 
Epica
Simone Simons – lead vocals
Mark Jansen – lead & rhythm guitar, grunts, screams
Isaac Delahaye – lead & rhythm guitar, backing vocals
Rob van der Loo – bass
Coen Janssen – synthesizer, piano
Ariën van Weesenbeek – drums

Additional musicians
Floor Jansen – vocals on "Stabat Mater Dolorosa" and "Sancta Terra"
Ad Sluijter – lead & rhythm guitar on "Quietus"
Yves Huts – bass on "Quietus"
Jeroen Simons – drums on "Quietus"
Tamás Kriston – violin on "Presto"

The Extended Hungarian Reményi Ede Chamber Orchestra

Benjamin Almassy – violin
Anna Bekes – violin
Zoltan Ficsor – violin
Boglárka Jobbágy-Balog – violin
Szófia Kaulics-Nagy – violin
Maria Császáriné Lazányi – violin
Diana Pavliskó – violin
Eva Siklosi – violin
Eszter Szavári-Sovány – violin
Tamás Kriston – violin
József Kautzky – viola
Anita Kiss – viola
Tamás Tóth – viola
Katalin Tressó – viola
Angelika Beres – celli
Hajnalka Csécsi – celli
Kamilla Matakovics – celli
Arpad Balog – double bass
Peter Lokös – double bass
Gyula Ács – clarinet
Sandor Czimer – clarinet
Istvan Molnar – trombone
Daniel Négyesi – trombone
Gyorgy Aranyosi – trumpet
Peter Gal – trumpet
Peter Lendvai – oboe
Andrea Csécsi – oboe
Janos Dobos – tuba
Tamás Dömötör – timpani
Istvan Halasz – bassoon
Krisztian Jardany – bassoon
Attila Kelemen – French horn
Sándor Horváth – French horn
Marianna Móri – flute
Tamás Siklósi – flute
Mark Viragh – percussion

The Choir of Miskolc National Theatre
Anett Baranyai, Boglarka Jambrik, Edina Kecskemeti, Nóra Kiss, Zsuzsa Kurucz, Éva Mészáros, Erika Radnai, Eva Vajda, Dániel Gyetvai, Balázs Bodnár Richard Hegedüs, Andras Marton, Nándor Nagy, Balász Székely, Roland Tötös, Dóra Diána Horváth, Ágnes Jordanov, Diána Kuttor, Mariann Majláth, Éva Orth, Oxana Pacsenko, Annette Simon, Szófia Tarczali, Dávid Dani, Sandor Demeter, Gergely Irlanda, Balazs Kolozsi, Robert Molnar, Mihály Petrány

Production
Zsolt Regos – conductor, choirmaster
Jochem Jacobs – engineering, editing, mixing, mastering
Sander van Gelswijck – engineering, editing, mixing, mastering
Stefan Heilemann – art direction, design
Tim Tronckoe – photography
Jeroen Aarts – photography
Evelyne Steenberghe – photography
Marcel de Vré – director

References 

Epica (band) albums
2013 live albums
Nuclear Blast live albums